Lesbia Harford (9 April 1891 – 5 July 1927) was an Australian poet, novelist and political activist.

Biography
Lesbia Venner Keogh was the first child of Edmund Joseph Keogh and Beatrice Eleanor Moore, great-great-granddaughter of an Earl of Drogheda. She was born at Brighton, Victoria, on 9 April 1891. From 1893 to 1900, the family lived at "Wangrabel", 6 Horsburgh Grove, Armadale (the house still stands today). Her father left home for Western Australia when his real estate business failed about 1900. She and her three siblings were raised by their mother, who took genteel jobs, begged handouts from Keogh relations and took in boarders. Harford was educated at the Sacré Cœur School at "Clifton", Malvern, Victoria; Mary's Mount school at Ballarat, Victoria; and the University of Melbourne, where she graduated LL.B. in 1916. She was one of the university's few women students and one of its few opponents of Australia's part in the First World War.

Her brother, Esmond Venner (Bill) Keogh, became a prominent medical administrator and cancer researcher.

Harford advocated free love in human relations. She herself formed lifelong parallel attachments to both men and women, most notably to Katie Lush, philosophy tutor at Ormond College.

Becoming interested in social questions, she worked in textile and clothing factories to gain first hand knowledge of the conditions under which women worked. She became state vice-president of the Federated Clothing and Allied Trades Union. She campaigned strongly against conscription in World War I. She was a friend of Norman Jeffrey and lover of Guido Baracchi, founding members of the Communist Party of Australia (but which she never joined). In Sydney Harford sang her poems to Guido as they crossed the harbour on the Manly ferry.

In 1918 she moved to Sydney to campaign for the release of the Sydney Twelve, members of the Industrial Workers of the World (the Wobblies) arrested and charged with treason, arson, sedition and forgery. She worked in clothing factories and as a university coach. She was also for a time a Fairfax housemaid (glimpsed in the poem "Miss Mary Fairfax"). She married Patrick John (Pat) Harford, sometime soldier, clicker in his uncle's Fitzroy boot factory and a fellow Wobbly, in 1920. They shared an interest in painting and aesthetics. He was feckless and alcoholic but

Pat wasn't Pat last night at all.He was the rain,—The Spring,—Young Dionysus, white and warm,—Lilac and everything.

They returned to her mother's boarding house in Elsternwick, Melbourne in the early Twenties. Pat worked for the post-impressionist painter William Frater and himself became a painter under Frater's influence, later moving towards modernism and cubism. The Harfords had no children and were estranged in the last years of Harford's life. Some writers claim they were divorced but there is no documentary evidence of it. In 1926 Harford completed her articles with a Melbourne law firm.

Authors agree on her always-delicate health but not on the cause: a severe attack of rheumatic fever while a young child (Serle); tuberculosis (Lamb); born with a heart problem that prevented her blood oxygenating (Sparrow). She often had to walk slowly. Her lips were sometimes quite blue. She died aged 36 of lung and heart failure in St Vincent's Hospital on 5 July 1927.

Writing
Harford had begun writing verse in 1910, and in May 1921 Birth, a small poetry magazine published at Melbourne, gave the whole of one number to a selection from her poems.

Harford's 59-page The Law Relating to Hire Purchase in Australia and New Zealand, "just written for the money it will bring", was published in 1923.

In 1927, three of her poems were included in Serle's An Australasian Anthology. The critic H.M. Green wrote "She has written some of the best lyrics among today's and certainly, I would say, the best love lyrics written out here."

Mrs Keogh thought Harford's writing was "beautiful" and in 1939 was still trying to get her novel and more poems published. In 1941 a small volume (54 poems) of The Poems of Lesbia Harford, edited by Nettie Palmer for Melbourne University Press, "revealed a poet of originality and charm."

In 1985, a much larger selection of poems appeared, edited by Marjorie Pizer and Drusilla Modjeska with a long introduction by Modjeska, acknowledging that some of Harford's sexual relations were with women and much of her love poetry was addressed to them. Les Murray published 86 of these poems and a page of biography in a 2005 anthology. Lehmann and Gray's obese 2011 Australian poetry since 1788 prints only thirteen poems (given "as much space as Brennan") but provides a scholarly and detailed critical biography.

The most recent selection in print is Collected Poems (UWAP, 2014), which has 250 poems, a two-page foreword by Les Murray and an eight-page introduction by the editor, Oliver Dennis.

Harford wrote a long-lost 190-page novel, The Invaluable Mystery, eventually published in 1987 with a foreword by Helen Garner and an introduction by Richard Nile and Robert Darby.

Papers
 For decades it was thought that "On her death her father took custody of her notebooks and they were lost when his shack was destroyed by fire" but this is now known to be false. All known Harford poems are in the exercise books in Folders 1–3 of the Marjorie Pizer Papers, Mitchell Library, NSW, MLMSS 7428. Another ten folders collect manuscripts, typescript, letters and photos relating mainly to publication of her work.
 The typescript of The Invaluable Mystery is in the National Archive of Australia, Canberra, Series A699, control 1958/3640, barcode 278433.

Legacy
The political rock band Redgum recorded part of Harford's poem "Periodicity" set to music as "Women in Change" on their 1980 album Virgin Ground.

In Melbourne, the Victorian Women Lawyers' biennial Lesbia Harford Oration, given by an eminent speaker on an issue of importance for women, is named in her honour.

In 1991, the Playbox Theatre Company Melbourne presented Earthly Paradise; a Picture of Lesbia Harford, by the playwright Darryl Emmerson. This play was also published by Currency Press, Sydney.

References

Further reading

External links

 
  Reproduced online by the University of Sydney as a PDF.
 Lesley Lamb, 'Harford, Lesbia Venner (1891–1927)', Australian Dictionary of Biography, Volume 9, Melbourne University Press, 1983, pp 195–196.
 
  251 poems in temporal order.
 
 Vickery, Ann, "Lesbia Harford's Romantic Legacy", in  pp. 81–132. Reproduces photos, workbook pages and a Patrick Harford painting.
 

1891 births
1927 deaths
Industrial Workers of the World members
Australian activists
Australian women poets
Melbourne Law School alumni
20th-century Australian poets
20th-century Australian women writers
19th-century Australian women
Anti–World War I activists
Tuberculosis deaths in Australia
20th-century deaths from tuberculosis
Infectious disease deaths in Victoria (Australia)
People from Armadale, Victoria
People educated at Loreto College, Victoria
People educated at Sacré Cœur School
Writers from Melbourne
Activists from Melbourne
Burials in Victoria (Australia)